John J. O'Hagan (born March 1936) was an Irish nationalist politician and business owner.

Born in Ballymena, O'Hagan studied at Ballymena Technical College before becoming an accountant, soon founding J. J. O'Hagan and Company.  He stood at the 1973 Northern Ireland local elections for Ballymena Borough Council as an independent, but was not elected.  After the election, he joined the Social Democratic and Labour Party (SDLP), and was immediately adopted as one of their candidates for North Antrim at the 1973 Northern Ireland Assembly election, even though the election was a mere six weeks later.  He was successful, becoming the only nationalist representative for the seat.  However, he did not stand for the Northern Ireland Constitutional Convention in 1975, instead leaving politics.

References

Independent politicians in Northern Ireland
Members of the Northern Ireland Assembly 1973–1974
People from Ballymena
Social Democratic and Labour Party politicians
1936 births
Living people